Pseudolasius isabellae is a species of ant in the subfamily Formicinae. It is found in Sri Lanka and Indonesia.

Subspecies
 Pseudolasius isabellae isabellae Forel, 1908 - Sri Lanka
 Pseudolasius isabellae simaluranus Forel, 1915 - Indonesia

References

External links

 at antwiki.org
Itis.gov
Animaldiversity.org

Formicinae
Hymenoptera of Asia
Insects described in 1908